Prague Seamstresses is a 1929 Czechoslovak comedy film directed by Přemysl Pražský.

Cast
Theodor Pištěk as  Barnabáš Bernásek 
 as  Márinka, Dressmaker 
Karel Lamač as  Jeník 
Marie Kopecká as  Běla 
Čeněk Šlégl as  Robert Řimbaba aka Mušoár 
Helena Monczáková as  Serafina Škrtilová 
Jiří Hron as  Vláďa Skružný 
Alois Dvorský as  Isidor Kulich 
Béďa Pražský as  Apprentice 
Saša Dobrovolná as  Mrs. Havlová 
Darja Hajská as  Cilka

References

External links 
 

1929 films
1929 comedy films
Czechoslovak black-and-white films
Czech silent films
Czechoslovak comedy films